The Legend of Kublai Khan, also known as Legend of Yuan Empire Founder, is a Chinese television series based on the life of Kublai Khan and the events leading to the establishment of the Mongol-led Yuan dynasty in China. The series started shooting in 2011. It premiered at the 2013 Shanghai Television Festival from 11 to 13 June 2013, and was first aired on HBS from 21 to 30 July 2013. The series was directed by Tsui Siu-ming and starred Hu Jun and Charmaine Sheh as Kublai Khan and Chabi, along with Cai Wenyan, Wu Yue, Tang Guoqiang, Gao Fa, Steven Ma and Ray Lui in supporting roles.

Plot
The series, spanning over 70 years, romanticises the life of Kublai Khan and the events leading to the establishment of the Mongol-led Yuan dynasty in China.

Kublai was born in 1215 as a son of Tolui, the fourth son of Genghis Khan. At the time, Töregene, the wife of Ögedei (Genghis Khan's third son), sees Tolui as a potential threat to her husband. As Tolui gains more glory for his victories in battle, Töregene worries whether Genghis Khan will choose Ögedei to be his successor. She also feels uneasy because the young Kublai is highly favoured by his grandfather.

Ögedei eventually succeeds his father as the Great Khan of the Mongol Empire. After Töregene secretly poisons Tolui to death, Tolui's sons, under the leadership of their eldest brother Möngke, seek to avenge their father. Töregene plans to use this opportunity to frame Möngke and his brothers of plotting treason against Ögedei, and thereby get rid of Tolui's clan. At this critical juncture, Kublai and his mother, Sorghaghtani, manage to convince his brothers not to do anything rash. Instead, they would secretly build up their forces, lie low and wait until the time is ripe to take revenge.

Following Ögedei's death, Töregene becomes the Regent of the Mongol Empire for some years until her son, Güyük, is elected as the new Great Khan. When Güyük dies in a conflict against his cousin Batu, his wife Qaimish takes over as the Regent for a brief period of time until Möngke becomes the new Great Khan.

A few years later, after Möngke dies in a battle against the Song Empire at Diaoyu Fortress, Kublai and his younger brother Ariq Böke engage in a power struggle to seize the succession. Kublai eventually overcomes his brother and secures his position as the Great Khan after defeating all his rivals. He conquers the rest of China and establishes the Yuan dynasty, becoming its founding emperor.

Cast

 Hu Jun as Kublai
 Su Jiahang as Kublai (young)
 Charmaine Sheh as Chabi
 Cai Wenyan as Töregene
 Wu Yue as Ariq Böke
 Lao Huanjie as Ariq Böke (young)
 Tang Guoqiang as Genghis Khan
 Gao Fa as Möngke
 Lei Haotian as Möngke (young)
 Steven Ma as Liu Bingzhong
 Ray Lui as Tolui
 Ba Sen as Ögedei
 Hasi Gaowa as Sorghaghtani
 Xie Miao as Širemün
 Xu Xiangdong as Huochi
 Du Yiheng as Hao Jing
 He Yanni as Yunlin
 Wang Huilai as Dong Wenyong
 Xu Dongmei as Kusa'er
 Huang Chien-chun as Güyük
 Jin Bo as Güyük (young)
 Debbie Goh as Qaimish
 Zhang Yan as Yelü Chucai / Yelü Zhu
 Liu Xiaoxiao as Hao Qin
 Zhang Jingda as Hulagu
 Zhang Bolun as Hulagu (young)
 Jin Tingting as Yina
 Zhang Jiaojiao as Yina (young)
 Sengge Renqin as Chilaun
 Dao'erji as Subutai
 Lu Ying as Anchen
 Liu Sibo as Fifth Princess
 Luo Huimiao as Alandar
 Ji Shuai as Liu Taiping
 He Ya'nan as Tana
 Wang Lu as Kaidu
 Li Hua as Yesutai
 Menghe Wuliji as Chagatai
 Hongtong Batu as Jochi
 Sude Siqin as Bo'orchu
 Siqin Bilige as Batu
 Gangte Mu'er as Shiban
 Dao'erji as Godan
 Liu Shijia as Godan (young)
 Baoyin Gexige as Mukha
 Dong Ming as Baodi
 Wang Zhengping as Reverend Haiyun
 Jiang Yongbo as Ahmad Fanakati
 Anna as Fatima
 Dalielihan Hade'er as Suhe
 Bate'er as Buhe
 Sulide as Batu
 Fan Yu as Qašin
 Suyou Lesiren as Yesu
 Hong Chang as Li Tan
 Yan Linfei as Wang Jian
 Yong Qing as Narisong
 Tao Ri as Taozi
 Tang Zhaokang as Jinhua
 Wudamu as Bateng
 Wang Xueqian as Zhenjin
 Yijile as Khochu
 Lan Tian as Hutu
 Jiang Haotong as Naohu

International broadcasts

Production
The Legend of Kublai Khan was produced at a cost of about 150 million yuan.

Awards
The Legend of Kublai Khan won the Golden Angel Award for Outstanding Television Series and Best Director of Chinese TV Series at the 2013 Chinese American Film Festival.

Controversy over title renaming
The Legend of Kublai Khan was released under the title The Genius of War – Kublai when it was aired on Hunan Broadcasting System (HBS) in July 2013. Apparently, this was done without the approval of the producers, and the reason behind the renaming is believed to be that HBS wanted to attract higher viewership. Director Tsui Siu-ming and lead actor Hu Jun expressed unhappiness over the renaming; Hu even wrote on his weibo, "Who changed the title? What genius of war?", and added an angry emoticon.

References

External links
  The Legend of Kublai Khan on Sina.com

2013 Chinese television series debuts
Television series set in the Mongol Empire
Television series set in the Yuan dynasty
Depictions of Genghis Khan on television
Chinese historical television series
Television series set in the 13th century